Zawady Oleckie  (also Zawada; , from 1938-45 Schwalgenort) is a village in the administrative district of Gmina Kowale Oleckie, within Olecko County, Warmian-Masurian Voivodeship, in northern Poland.

References

Zawady Oleckie